Ugo Magnetto (born November 26, 1902 in Borghetto Santo Spirito) was an Italian professional football player.

1902 births
Year of death missing
Italian footballers
Serie A players
Inter Milan players
Association football midfielders
U.S. Imperia 1923 players